Sunny Hill Park is a park in Hendon, in the London Borough of Barnet, England. It is a large hilly park, 22 hectares, mainly grassed, which has extensive views to the north and the west. Together with the neighbouring Hendon Churchyard, it is a Site of Local Importance for Nature Conservation.

The site used to be Sunnyhill Fields, and was owned by Church Farmhouse, now the adjoining Church Farmhouse Museum. In 1921 Hendon Council purchased 16 acres for a park, which opened in 1922, and in 1929 it was enlarged when further land was acquired. An area with scattered trees in the south-east corner was formerly part of St Mary's Churchyard, an important archaeological site with evidence of Roman and Anglo-Saxon occupation. The park still has hedgerows showing former field boundaries and mature trees.

It has a cafe, a playground, various tennis and basketball courts and football pitches.

There is access from Church End, Sunny Hill, Watford Way, Great North Way, Sunny Gardens Road, Sunningfields Crescent and Church Terrace.

Gallery

See also

 Barnet parks and open spaces
 Nature reserves in Barnet

External links
Sunny Hill Park, London Gardens Online

Further reading

Notes

Nature reserves in the London Borough of Barnet
Parks and open spaces in the London Borough of Barnet
Hendon